Calliostoma coronatum is a species of sea snail, a marine gastropod mollusk in the family Calliostomatidae.

Calliostoma coronatum B. A. Marshall, 1995 is an invalid name: junior homonym of Calliostoma coronatum Quinn, 1992; Calliostoma kanakorum is a replacement name)

Description
The height of the cone-shaped shell attains 4.5 mm.

Distribution
This species occurs in the Western Atlantic Ocean, predominantly off Brazil at a depth of 800 m.

References

 Quinn, J. F. Jr. 1992. New species of Calliostoma Swainson, 1840 (Gastropoda: Trochidae), and notes on some poorly known species from the Western Atlantic Ocean. Nautilus 106: 77-114.

External links
 To Biodiversity Heritage Library (2 publications)
 To Encyclopedia of Life
 To World Register of Marine Species
 

coronatum
Gastropods described in 1992